Haralabos "Bob" Voulgaris (born 4 July 1975) is a Greek-Canadian professional gambler and principal owner of Spanish soccer club CD Castellón. Formerly the director of quantitative research and development for the Dallas Mavericks, Voulgaris was considered one of the most prolific NBA sports bettors in the world.

Gambling career
In addition to NBA betting, Voulgaris is also a poker enthusiast who has cashed for $3.090 million in live tournaments. He won that sum over the course of 14 years and 19 different events.

One of his biggest wins dates back from September 2007, when he finished 3rd in the $10K NLHE Championship event at the WPT Borgata Open for $434,560.

He came in fourth place in the 2017 WSOP One Drop event for his largest tournament win, pocketing $1,158,883.

Voulgaris also participates in Live Cash Games, and as such, appeared on PokerGO's revived version of Poker After Dark. He played a super high stakes, $300/$600 NLHE cash game session against Phil Galfond, Bill Perkins, and others.

Tom Dwan's alleged million-dollar debt 
During an interview given to Joe Ingram back in 2015, Voulgaris mentioned a "former NVG superhero" poker pro owing him millions of dollars after he agreed to place bets for him with an unknown bookmaker. The poker scene did the rest, with influencers such as Doug Polk speculating on the identity of said poker player, and coming to the conclusion that it could be Tom Dwan, a rumour that has not been confirmed.
On Joe Ingram's 7 October 2022 podcast, Voulgaris referenced the multi-million dollar debt and acknowledged that Tom has repaid him.

Dallas Mavericks
On 4 October 2018, the Dallas Mavericks hired Voulgaris as Director of Quantitative Research and Development. On 16 June 2021, just two days after an article was released about conflicts that had arisen in the front office, conflicting reports surfaced that Voulgaris and the Mavericks parted ways.

CD Castellón
Voulgaris acquired Spanish soccer club CD Castellón in July 2022. The move came one year after Voulgaris departed his role as Director of Quantitative Research and Development for the Dallas Mavericks. CD Castellón plays in Spain's third division, Primera División RFEF – Group 2. When Voulgaris purchased the club, the team had not reached the top-level Spanish soccer league La Liga in more than three decades.

See also
 Jon Price
 Zeljko Ranogajec
 Bill Benter
 Billy Walters (gambler)

References

External links
 Haralabos Voulgaris. Hendon Mob

1975 births
Canadian poker players
Canadian gamblers
Living people